Joseph Cassara (born 1989) is an American writer, whose debut novel The House of Impossible Beauties was published in 2018. The novel, an exploration of drag culture in New York City in the 1980s during the HIV/AIDS crisis, was inspired in part by Angie Xtravaganza and the film Paris Is Burning.

Originally from New Jersey, he was educated at Columbia University and the Iowa Writers’ Workshop.

The novel won Publishing Triangle's Edmund White Award for LGBT debut fiction in 2019, and was shortlisted for the Lambda Literary Award for Gay Fiction at the 31st Lambda Literary Awards.

References

External links

1989 births
21st-century American novelists
21st-century American male writers
American male novelists
American LGBT novelists
American gay writers
Writers from New Jersey
Living people

Columbia College (New York) alumni
Iowa Writers' Workshop alumni